Anomiopus caputipilus is a species of true dung beetle that is endemic to Goiás and Mato Grosso in Brazil. It occurs in cerrado above 700 m altitude. It may be a myrmecophile. It may be threatened by soy bean, cotton and sunflower plantations and cattle ranching.

References

caputipilus
Endemic fauna of Brazil
Beetles described in 2004